is a Japanese manga written and illustrated by Kanahei. It began serialization in Shueisha's Ribon magazine with the October 2011 issue. A series of anime shorts based on the manga premiered in February 2015 which ran for four episodes.

Media

Manga
Onna no Ko tte. is a manga written and illustrated by Kanahei. It began serialization in Shueisha's Ribon magazine with the October 2011 issue. The first tankōbon volume was released on March 15, 2013; the fourth volume was published on June 24, 2016.

Anime
An anime television series adaptation premiered in February 2015. The anime consists of four shorts that aired on the children's variety program Oha Suta. The anime was animated in Adobe Flash.

References

Comedy anime and manga
Shueisha franchises
Shueisha manga
Shōjo manga
Flash cartoons